Alfred Sydney Nunn (15 November 1899–1946) was an English footballer who played in the Football League for Clapton Orient and Luton Town.

References

1899 births
1946 deaths
English footballers
Association football forwards
English Football League players
Leyton Orient F.C. players
Folkestone F.C. players
Luton Town F.C. players